Good Fences is a 2003 American comedy-drama television film directed by Ernest Dickerson and written by Trey Ellis, based on the 1997 novel of the same name by his wife Erika Ellis. The film is about the stresses of prejudice on an upwardly mobile black family in 1970s Greenwich, Connecticut.  Danny Glover plays the overworked, stressed husband and Whoopi Goldberg plays his steadfast wife. 

Good Fences was produced by Spike Lee's 40 Acres and a Mule Filmworks. It premiered at the 2003 Sundance Film Festival, and aired on Showtime on February 2, 2003. Goldberg won an Image Award for her role.

Cast
 Whoopie Goldberg as Mabel Spader
 Danny Glover as Tom Spader
 Mo'Nique as Ruth Crisp
 Ashley Archer as Stormy (age 13)
 Ryan Michelle Bathe as Stormy (age 17)
 Vincent McCurdy-Clark as Tommy-Two (age 12)
 Zachary Simmons Glover as Tommy-Two (age 17)

Reception
The New York Times reviewed the film positively, as did Dove.

References

External links
 
 

2003 television films
2003 films
2003 comedy-drama films
2000s American films
2000s English-language films
40 Acres and a Mule Filmworks films
African-American comedy-drama films
American comedy-drama television films
Films based on American novels
Films directed by Ernest Dickerson
Films set in the 1970s
Films set in Connecticut
Showtime (TV network) films
Television films based on books